Abati (also Romanized as Ābāţī and Ābātī) is a village in Rahal Rural District, in the Central District of Khoy County, West Azerbaijan Province, Iran. At the 2006 census, its population was 85, in 22 families.

References 

Populated places in Khoy County